Gust Goettl was an inventor, entrepreneur, businessman. Many times he did not invent a product, but he did use existing designs to influence future designs. For example, “he did not invent the evaporative cooler, he kept improving it”. One of his changes to this particular invention resulted in the "Combination Refrigeration and Evaporative Cooling Air Conditioner,” designed to improve cooling in arid climates.

Early life 
Goettl was born on December 3, 1910, in Austria-Hungary. He moved to Mansfield, Ohio in 1913 with his family and was later inspired by the weather there to seek a job in the heating and cooling industry. From a young age, he was an inventor.

Career 
Goettl worked throughout his life in the HVAC community. With his brother, Adam, they founded Phoenix-based Goettl Air Conditioning on February 14, 1939.

In 1939, Gust also helped his brothers Adam and William Goettl to form IMPCO (International Metal Products Co.), which became a market leader by the 1940s in the evaporative cooler industry. Gust and Adam, as sole stockholders, sold the company in the 1960s to International Metal and sold the building they worked in to McGraw-Edison. An employee of McGraw-Edison fell through the roof shortly after and accused the Goettl brothers of negligence.

Personal life 
Gust was involved in community work. He enjoyed the outdoors through traveling, fishing, hunting, camping and golfing. He was the 54th person in the state of Arizona to earn the Arizona Wildlife Sportsmen Big 10 award. Gust was a man of faith, and a member of the Shepherd of the Valley Lutheran Church, where he was named Churchman Cum Laude in 1959 and helped build a new church building for the congregation. Gust's charity work also included fundraising for children-oriented organizations and for the Lighthouse Mission, which awarded him in 1967 for his service.

Gust Goettl married Magdalene Kelpp on June 10, 1933, in Mansfield, Ohio. They were married for 71 years until Gust died at the age of 93 on November 24, 2004.

References 

Heating, ventilation, and air conditioning
20th-century American inventors
20th-century American businesspeople
Austro-Hungarian emigrants to the United States
American Lutherans
1910 births
2004 deaths
20th-century Lutherans